Moms at War is a 2018 Nigerian comedy drama movie directed by Omoni Oboli. It stars Funke Akindele as well as Michelle Dede, the former of whom won an award for her role as Best Actress in a Comedy (Movie/TV Series) at the 2020 Africa Magic Viewers' Choice Awards.

The film is a collaboration between Inkblot, FilmOne, and Dioni Visions. It was premiered in August 2018 at the Filmhouse Cinemas in Lekki, Lagos. It was released on August 17, 2018.

Synopsis
It tells the story of two mothers who compete against each other to ensure success in the lives of their children, particularly in a scholarship competition.

Omoni Oboli says she was inspired to write and direct the movie because of her own childhood experiences.

References

2018 films
English-language Nigerian films
Nigerian comedy-drama films
2018 comedy-drama films
2010s English-language films